Damián Furmanski (born 5 October 1975) is a former professional tennis player from Argentina.

Biography
Furmanski began competing on tour in the early 1990s. He represented Argentina at the 1993 Maccabiah Games in Israel. 

As a professional player he competed mostly on the Futures and Challenger circuits. His only main draw appearance on the ATP Tour came in the doubles at the 1997 U.S. Pro Tennis Championships in Boston, where he and partner José Frontera featured as lucky losers from qualifying. In 1999 he won the Mexico City Challenger doubles title partnering Gastón Etlis. He reached his best singles ranking of 198 in the world in 2000.

After retiring from the tour in 2002, Furmanski moved to Dallas, Texas to launch a tennis academy.

Challenger titles

Doubles: (1)

References

External links
 
 

1975 births
Living people
Argentine male tennis players
Competitors at the 1993 Maccabiah Games
Maccabiah Games tennis players
Maccabiah Games competitors for Argentina
Jewish Argentine sportspeople
Jewish tennis players